The Mobile Police Command (K02) is a paramilitary police (gendarmerie) unit under the Vietnam People's Public Security force that implements armed measures to protect national security, preserve social order and safety, and perform other tasks according to regulations provisions of law.

 Traditional date: April 15 every year
 Head office: No. 23 Nguyễn Khang, Trung Hoà ward, Cầu Giấy district, Hanoi City.

History 
 On December 11, 2009, the Minister of Public Security signed the Decision No. 4058/QD-BCA establishing the Command of Mobile Police under the Ministry of Public Security.
 On December 9, 2013, the Secretariat of the Party Central Committee (XI term) issued Regulation No. 216-QD/TW on the implementation of the regime of political commissars and politicians at the Mobile Police Command, Ministry of Public Security.
In June 2020, Mobile Police Command and the  Ministry of Public Security launched a mobile mounted combat unit called the Mobile Mounted Police Regiment to tackle increasingly complex crimes and protect national security. It can also  engage in rescues in mountainous areas as well as transport weapons and food to remote areas.

Mission 
1. Advise the Central Public Security Party Committee and the Ministry of Public Security on the work of armed forces to protect national security, maintain social order and safety, and build a mobile police force.

2. Implement combat plans against activities sabotaging security, armed riots, terrorism, kidnapping hostages; suppressing criminals using weapons; disbanding illegal disturbances and demonstrations.

3. Organize patrols, control and handle violations of the law on social security, order and safety; conduct a number of investigative activities in accordance with the law.

4. Organize the protection of important political, economic, diplomatic, scientific – technical, cultural, special shipments, conferences and important events according to the list prescribed by the Government.

5. Participating in the protection of court sessions, escorting the accused and defendants, and assisting in the protection of prisons and detention camps, and executing criminal judgments according to the regulations of the Minister of Public Security.

6. Organizing political, legal and professional training and retraining; formulating and rehearsing combat plans, patrolling and target protection plans according to the functions and tasks of the Mobile Police.

7. Organization of management, training and use of service animals.

8. Performing rituals in the People's Police.

9. Participating in search, rescue, prevention, combat and overcoming of natural disasters.

10. Participating in and coordinating with forces, units and localities where they are stationed to build a movement of all people to protect national security.

11. In an urgent situation to handle the situations specified in Clause 2 of this Article, or to chase down people and means that violate the law, or to give first aid to victims, they may mobilize people and vehicles of individuals and organizations.

12. Requisition of property in service of the Mobile Police's operations shall comply with the law on property requisition and requisition.

13. To have the right to request agencies, organizations and individuals to provide diagrams, designs and drawings of works and to enter personal residences, offices of agencies and organizations to rescue hostages and suppress acts of violence, terrorism and crime with weapons. The entry to the headquarters of diplomatic missions, foreign consular missions, representative offices of international organizations and the accommodation of members of these agencies in Vietnam must comply with the provisions of Vietnamese law and international treaties to which the Socialist Republic of Vietnam is a signatory.

14. Manage weapons, explosives, combat gears and technical means in service of the Mobile Police's operations according to the regulations of the Minister of Public Security.

15. International cooperation in accordance with the law.

16. Perform other tasks and exercise other powers as prescribed by law.

Today's leaders 
 Commander: Lieutenant-General Phạm Quốc Cương
 Standing Deputy Commander: Brigadier Vũ Ngọc Riềm
 Deputy Commander: Brigadier Nguyễn Thanh Bảnh
 Deputy Commander: Brigadier Phạm Văn Bảng
 Deputy Commander: Brigadier Nguyễn Ngọc Thanh
 Deputy Commander: Brigadier Lê Văn Sao
 Deputy Commander: Colonel Trần Đình Đức
 Deputy Commander: Colonel Phùng Văn Chiến
 Deputy Commander: Colonel Phạm Hữu Thinh
Mobile Police includes:

 Special force
 Special Operations Forces
 Target Protection Force
 Training and use of service animals
 Special cargo transport force
 Air force, water force

Component 
 Department of Staff – Operations 
 Political Bureau
 Department of Logistics – Engineering
 Department of Management, Training and Use of Service Animals
 Financial Committee
 Inspector of Command
 People's Police Ceremonial Delegation – Team Leader: Colonel Đỗ Ngọc Anh
 Professional Training and Retraining Center – Manager: Colonel Phan Công Côn
 Northern Standing Office (Cluster A) (Hanoi)
 Central Standing Office (Cluster C) (Da Nang)
 Standing Agency for the South (Cluster B) (HCMC)
 Mobile Police Department of Provincial Public Security
 Central Highlands Mobile Police Regiment (E20):
 1st Battalion (Gia Lai)
 2nd Battalion (Đắk Lắk)
 3rd Battalion (Lâm Đồng)
 Southwestern Mobile Police Regiment (E21):
 1st Battalion (Cần Thơ)
 2nd Battalion (Trà Vinh)
 3rd Battalion (An Giang)
 4th Battalion (Bạc Liêu)
 5th Battalion (Phú Quốc – Kiên Giang)
 Capital Mobile Police Regiment (E22), (Hanoi):
 1st Battalion (Hanoi)
 2nd Battalion (Hanoi)
 3rd Battalion (Hưng Yên)
 4th Battalion (Hà Nam)
 South Central Mobile Police Regiment (E23):
 1st Battalion (Bình Định)
 2nd Battalion (Khánh Hoà)
 3rd Battalion (Quảng Ngãi)
 Northwestern Mobile Police Regiment (E24):
 1st Battalion (Điện Biên)
 2nd Battalion (Sơn La)
 3rd Battalion (Yên Bái)
 4th Battalion (Lào Cai)
 South East Mobile Police Regiment (E25):
 1st Battalion (Đồng Nai)
 2nd Battalion (Bình Dương)
 3rd Battalion (Bình Thuận)
 North Central Mobile Police Regiment (E26):
 1st Battalion (Nghệ An)
 4th Battalion (Thanh Hóa)
 2nd Battalion (Hà Tĩnh)
 3rd Battalion (Quảng Bình)
 Northeastern Mobile Police Regiment (E27), (Quảng Ninh):
 1st Battalion (Quảng Ninh)
 2nd Battalion (Lạng Sơn)
 3rd Battalion (Thái Nguyên)

 Central Mobile Police Regiment (E28), (Da Nang):
 1st Battalion (Đà Nẵng)
 2nd Battalion (Huế)
 3rd Battalion (Quảng Nam)

 Ho Chi Minh City Southeast Mobile Police Regiment (E29):
 1st Battalion (Ho Chi Minh City)
 2nd Battalion (Ho Chi Minh City)
 3rd Battalion (Long An)
 Battalion for target protection and special cargo protection (Ho Chi Minh City)
 Ceremonial Company (Ho Chi Minh City)
 Police Regiment Protecting Targets of Diplomatic Missions (E30) – (Hanoi)
 Police Regiment protects political, economic, cultural, social, scientific and technical objectives (E31) – (Hanoi City)
 Airborne Special Forces Regiment (E32) - (Hanoi City)
 Police Battalion to protect special cargo transport (Hanoi City)
 1st Special Police Battalion (Hanoi)
 3rd Special Police Battalion (Da Nang)
 2nd Special Police Battalion (Ho Chi Minh City)
 Special Cavalry Regiment

Rewards 
 Order of Ho Chi Minh (2014)

Commanders through the ages

Commanders

Political commissars 
 March 2014 – August 2018, Đỗ Đức Kính, Major General, Lieutenant General (2014), former Director of Phú Thọ Provincial Police

Deputy commanders 
 Deputy Commander: Major general Nguyễn Duy Hải
 Deputy Commander: Major general Trần Quang Họa
 Deputy Commander: Major general Nguyễn Thanh Bảnh
 Deputy Commander: Major general Hoàng Thọ Mạnh
 Deputy Commander: Major general Phạm Quốc Cương (now Lieutenant-General, Mobile Police Commander)
 Deputy Commander: Major general Nguyễn Văn Uy
 Deputy Commander: Major general Vũ Ngọc Riềm
 Deputy Commander: Major general Ngô Văn Tiếu
 Deputy Commander: Major general Nguyễn Quốc Tuấn
 Deputy Commander: Senior colonel Phạm Văn Lân
 Deputy Commander: Senior colonel Nguyễn Quốc Đoàn (now a member of the 13th Party Central Committee – Standing Deputy Secretary of Thừa Thiên Huế Provincial Party Committee)
 Deputy Commander: Major general Bùi Tiến Cam retired
 Deputy Commander: Senior colonel Nguyễn Văn Diện

Deputy political commissars 
 March 2014 – June 2018: Colonel Vũ Hồng Văn (now Director of Đồng Nai Provincial Police)

Note 

Law enforcement in Vietnam
2009 establishments in Vietnam